Prof James Greig Smith FRSE (1854–1897) was a 19th-century Scottish surgeon and author of the highly successful textbook Abdominal Surgery.

A keen sportsman his interests included yachting, shooting, golf and boxing. He was also a heavy smoker.

Life

He was born at Nigg, a small village just outside Aberdeen. He was educated at Aberdeen Grammar School under William Barrack then studied for a general degree at Aberdeen University, gaining a general degree (MA) in 1873, then studied Medicine under Prof William Pirrie graduating MB ChB in 1876. He then joined Bristol Royal Infirmary as a Junior House Surgeon. In 1879 he was promoted to Senior Surgeon (aged only 25).

In 1883 he was elected a Fellow of the Royal Society of Edinburgh. His proposers were William Stirling, John Charles Ogilvie Will, Joseph Lister and Henry Marshall.

From 1883 to 1890 he edited the Bristol Medico-Chirurgical Journal with L. M. Griffiths. From 1888 he lectured in Surgery at University College, Bristol. In 1893 he became President of the Bristol Medico-Chirurgical Society, in the same year becoming Professor of Surgery at the university.

He died in Bristol on 29 May 1897 following a short period of pneumonia. He was only 43 years old. He is buried at Redland Green Cemetery.

Publications

Abdominal Surgery (1888 and multiple later editions) also translated into French, German and Italian

Family
He was married with one daughter.

References

1854 births
1897 deaths
People from Aberdeen
Alumni of the University of Aberdeen
Academics of the University of Bristol
Fellows of the Royal Society of Edinburgh
Scottish surgeons